Arthur Decabooter (3 October 1936 – 26 May 2012) was a Belgian professional racing cyclist, active as a professional between 1959 and 1967. Cyclist Walter Godefroot is his wife's brother-in-law.

Apart from a few years when he was signed to Libéria-Grammont (1962) and to Solo (1963–1964), he rode for the Groene Leeuw team. His major wins were the 1960 Tour of Flanders and 2 stages and the points classification in the Vuelta a España the same year. Decabooter's other wins include Dwars door België, Omloop Het Volk, Kuurne–Brussels–Kuurne, E3 Prijs Vlaanderen – Harelbeke, and a stage in the Tour of Belgium.

Major Results

Road

1955
 1st Ronde van Vlaanderen Beloften
 3th Overall Omloop der 9 Provincies
 1st Stages 3, 6 (ITT) & 7
 1st Grand Prix of Essex
 3rd Gent–Wevelgem amateurs
1958
 1st GP Gemeente Kortemark
 1st GP Erpe-Mere
 1st Nokere Koerse
1st Ronde van Vlaanderen Independents
1959
 1st Dr. Tistaertprijs Zottegem
 1st Omloop van het Houtland
2nd Omloop der Vlaamse Ardennen
2nd Kuurne–Brussels–Kuurne
2nd Omloop Mandel-Leie-Schelde
2nd Dwars door West-Vlaanderen
4th Ronde van Vlaanderen
1960
 1st Kampioenschap van Oost-Vlaanderen
 1st Tour of Flanders
 1st Overall Dwars door België
 1st Grote Prijs Marcel Kint
 Vuelta a España
 1st  Points classification
 1st Stages 8 & 15
 1st Stages 1 & 4 (TTT) of the Tour of Belgium
 1st Schelde–Dender–Leie
 2nd Omloop van het Houtland
 3rd  National Road Race Championships
4th Milan–San Remo
1961
 1st Omloop Het Volk
 1st E3 Prijs Vlaanderen – Harelbeke
 1st Stage 11 of the Vuelta a España
 1st Grand Prix de Denain
 1st GP Briek Schotte
3rd Omloop der Vlaamse Gewesten
1962
 1st Omloop van Midden-Vlaanderen
2nd Omloop der Vlaamse Gewesten
2nd GP Frans Melckenbeek
3rd Schaal Sels
3rd Ronde van Brabant
1963
 1st Omloop der drie Provinciën
1st Omloop Leidedal
2nd Omloop van West-Brabant
 3rd Grote Prijs Marcel Kint
1964
 1st Kuurne–Brussels–Kuurne
 1st Omloop van het Houtland
 2nd Omloop Het Volk
 2nd Omloop van Midden-Vlaanderen
 2nd GP Roeselare
3rd Halle–Ingooigem
6th Ronde van Vlaanderen
1965
 1st Nokere Koerse
 1st Geraardsbergen-Viane
1st Stage 3 (TTT) Tour du Nord
 2nd Circuit des Frontières
 2nd Kampioenschap van Vlaanderen
 3rd  National Road Race Championships
 3rd Omloop van Midden-Vlaanderen
5th Paris–Tours
9th Tour of Flanders
1966
 1st Stages 6 & 8 of the Vuelta a Andalucía
 1st Elfstedenronde
1st Stage 5a of the Four Days of Dunkirk
8th Paris–Roubaix
1967
1st Omloop der Vlaamse Gewesten
1st Roubaix-Cassel-Roubaix
 2nd Elfstedenronde
9th Paris–Roubaix

Track
1961
 3rd Six Days of Ghent (with Klaus Bugdahl)
1962
3rd  Belgian National Championships (with Willy Vannitsen)
1963
3rd  Belgian National Championships (with Willy Vannitsen)
1961
 3rd Six Days of Madrid (with José Manuel López Rodríguez)

References

External links

 Palmares of Arthur Decabooter

1936 births
2012 deaths
Belgian Vuelta a España stage winners
Belgian male cyclists
People from Oudenaarde
Cyclists from East Flanders